Kato Airport  is an airport serving the village of Kato, in the Potaro-Siparuni Region of Guyana.

See also

 List of airports in Guyana
 Transport in Guyana

References

External links
Kato Airport
OpenStreetMap - Kato
OurAirports - Kato

Airports in Guyana